No Strings is a 1962 musical drama with a book by Samuel A. Taylor and words and music by Richard Rodgers.

No Strings may also refer to:
No Strings (album), an album by Sheena Easton
"No Strings (I'm Fancy Free)", a popular song written by Irving Berlin for the 1935 film Top Hat
"No Strings" (song), a song by Chloe Howl
"No Strings...", a song by Roots Manuva from the album Run Come Save Me
No Strings, a 1967 comedy TV film starring Arthur Askey
 No Strings (1974 TV series), a British television comedy by Carla Lane
 No Strings (1989 TV series), a British television comedy

See also
No Strings Attached (disambiguation)